My My may refer to:

 My-My (horse) (1957-1968), a show horse
 "My My (Bad Fruit)", a 2006 song by Mason Proper from the album There Is a Moth in Your Chest
 "My My", a 2010 song by Liz Phair from the album Funstyle
 "My My", a 2011 single by Korean girl group A Pink from the album Snow Pink
 "My My", a 2020 song by Seventeen from the EP Heng:garæ

See also
 My My My (disambiguation)
 My Oh My (disambiguation)